Eva Lang may refer to:
 Eva Lang (economist)
 Eva Lang (actress)
 Eva Lang (writer)